This article is a summary of common slang words and phrases used in Puerto Rico.  Idiomatic expressions may be difficult to translate fully and may have multiple meanings, so the English translations below may not reflect the full meaning of the expression they intend to translate. This is a short list and more may be found on the Academia Puertorriqueña de la Lengua Española website.

List

a sudden nervous reaction, similar to hysterics, or losing control, experienced in response to something

 variants are ¡Ay bendito! and dito -  “aw man” or “oh my god”; “ay” meaning lament, and “bendito” meaning blessed.

 Referring to food; rotten or damaged.

 Wild, off the rails, disastrous. Doing something rash. Comes from a French expression. 

 flawless, clean, immaculate. From standard Spanish 

 a big party.

Important person. From English .

Beer.

 gossip 

The name given to Puerto Rico people by Puerto Ricans.

To work on a task, to do something with effort and dedication.

 brother or friend.

a lowlife. Comes from Arabic "Al-Kafir"

A badass, hunk or hottie. An influential person. From English .

person who should be ashamed of their actions but isn't; a stubborn person 

short for  - Guy, male

 While in other countries this word means "insolence", in Puerto Rico it has an entirely different meaning and is used to describe that something is good, fun, funny, great or beautiful.

 Friend, or group of friends.

 Normally means “hard”, but in Puerto Rican slang means that someone is really good at what they do.

 series of lies, something that is completely false, a "pack of lies"

 literally translates to "eww!" or "yuck!" it is often used as an exclamation in reaction to a bad smell.

 shameless person

 The flower of the sugarcane.

 steep slope

 to act goofy.

 “to hang out”. Comes from the American expression “hang out”.

 to be full.

 boyfriend / girlfriend

 A person who lives in the countryside or mountain people.

 Drunk

Lackey,brownoser;toady,sycophant.    

to peep
 
Peeping Tom 

 Also, "limbel". A home-made flavored frozen treat usually made from natural fruits or sweet milk mixtures and often served on a small piece of water-resistant paper, a plastic or paper cup, or a popsicle stick. The name is said to have originated from the last name of Charles Lindbergh after the islanders noticed how "awfully cold as ice" he was as compared to the warmth of the locals during Lindbergh's visit to the Island in 1928.

 Used when referring to something that is easy to do.

 Terms of endearment; mami when referring to a cute woman, papi when referring to a handsome man, or to address a lover

 Boy/girl In standard Spanish it means "baby".

 Friend / Buddy ("pana" is also a name for breadfruit in Puerto Rico) From .

to get away with murder or to get away with it

 A way of dancing ("grinding") or a danceable song.

 “forget about that”, Disregard.  

Expression of admiration, to say that something is outstanding or beyond good.

 Used to describe chaotic situations.

to get away with murder or to get away with it

 a nobody, or a worker low on the hierarchy, or an enabler

traffic jam. In standard Spanish, "a bottle top" or "a clog".

a lowlife.

See also 

 Puerto Rican Spanish
 Spanish dialects and varieties

References

Slang words and phrases
Spanish slang
Lists of phrases
Lists of words
Lists of slang

Slang words and phrases
Spanish language in the United States